The Harder They Come is the soundtrack album to the film of the same name, released in 1972 in the United Kingdom as Island Records ILPS 9202. It was issued in February 1973 in North America as Mango Records SMAS-7400. It peaked at No. 140 on the Billboard 200.
In 2021, the album was deemed "culturally, historically, or aesthetically significant" by the Library of Congress and selected for preservation in the National Recording Registry.

Recordings
The heart of the soundtrack comes from performances by the film's star, reggae singer Jimmy Cliff. Only the title track "The Harder They Come" was recorded by Cliff specifically for the soundtrack, with three earlier songs by Cliff added. The remainder of the album is a compilation of singles released in Jamaica from the period of 1967 through 1972, assembled by The Harder They Come director and co-writer, Perry Henzell, from songs by favored reggae singers. In addition to Cliff, these artists include the Melodians, the Slickers, DJ Scotty, and seminal early reggae stars Desmond Dekker and Toots and the Maytals.

Two songs are repeated on side two to end the album. The second version of "You Can Get It If You Really Want" is a dub version of the song mostly minus a few vocals, while the second version of "The Harder They Come" is an alternate take.

Reception and legacy
In Christgau's Record Guide: Rock Albums of the Seventies (1981), Robert Christgau said the soundtrack "collected the best songs of artists whose music was either unavailable or not rich enough to fill an LP".

The soundtrack album played a major part in popularizing reggae in the United States and the world beyond, the film itself preventing the genre from remaining an isolated phenomenon in Jamaica. In 2003, the album was ranked number 119 on Rolling Stone magazine's list of the 500 greatest albums of all time, number 122 in a 2012 revision, and number 174 in the 2020 reboot of the list. The album also appears on greatest albums lists from Time and Blender, and was named the 97th best album of the 1970s by Pitchfork Media.

On August 5, 2003, Universal Music Group issued a deluxe edition of the album, with the original remastered and reissued on one disc. A bonus disc continued the idea of the original soundtrack itself, compiling additional singles from the early days of reggae, entitled Reggae Hit the Town: Crucial Reggae 1968-1972.

Track listing

Personnel

 Jimmy Cliff – vocals
 Dave and Ansel Collins – vocals reissue tracks
 Desmond Dekker – vocals
 Eric Donaldson – vocals reissue tracks
 The Ethiopians – vocals reissue tracks
 The Maytals – vocals
 The Melodians – vocals
 Johnny Nash – vocals reissue tracks
 Scotty – vocals
 The Slickers – vocals
 The Uniques – vocals reissue tracks
 Jackie Jackson – bass guitar
 Winston Grennan – drums
 Beverley's All-Stars – instruments

 Gully Bright – producer
 Jimmy Cliff – producer
 Tommy Cowan – producer reissue tracks
 Larry Fallon – producer reissue tracks
 Derrick Harriott – producer
 Leslie Kong – producer
 Bunny Lee – producer reissue tracks
 Byron Lee – producer
 Warwick Lyn – producer reissue tracks
 Johnny Nash – producer reissue tracks
 Winston Riley – producer reissue tracks

Reissue personnel
 Dana Smart – supervisor
 Pat Lawrence – executive producer
 Vartan – reissue art director
 John Bryant – cover illustrator
 Gavin Larsen – digital mastering

References

Crime film soundtracks
Jimmy Cliff albums
1972 soundtrack albums
Reggae soundtracks
Island Records soundtracks
United States National Recording Registry recordings
United States National Recording Registry albums